Frank Grimes (born 1947), is an Irish actor.

Frank Grimes may also refer to:

Frank Grimes, a character in The Simpsons
Frank Grimes, Jr., son of Frank Grimes, in The Simpsons episode "The Great Louse Detective"
Lt. Frank Grimes, character in the 2002 movie John Q
Francis "Frank" Grimes, character in the show Ugly Americans